Shrapnel was a punk rock band formed in 1981 in Briton Ferry, Wales. Among other accomplishments, the band toured Ireland with the British band Subhumans in 1984. In 1988 Shrapnel split an LP with Scottish band Toxik Ephex for the new Welsh label Words of Warning, but the band folded following their subsequent 1988 UK tour with San Francisco band Christ on Parade. 

The band's lineup included Andrew Kingdom (vocals), Mark Rees (bass), Paul Summers (guitar), Ivor White (guitar) and Geoff James (drums).

References

Further reading
Shrapnel at SwanseaPunk.co.uk

Welsh punk rock groups
Neath
1981 establishments in Wales
Musical groups established in 1981
Musical groups disestablished in 1988